Hans Aichele (2 November 1911 – 1948) was a Swiss bobsledder who competed in the late 1930s. He won a silver medal in the four-man event at the 1936 Winter Olympics in Garmisch-Partenkirchen.

Aichele also won a bronze medal in the two-man event at the 1937 FIBT World Championships in Cortina d'Ampezzo.

References
 Bobsleigh four-man Olympic medalists for 1924, 1932-56, and since 1964
 Bobsleigh two-man world championship medalists since 1931
 DatabaseOlympics.com profile
 Hans Aichele's profile at Sports Reference.com

1911 births
1948 deaths
Bobsledders at the 1936 Winter Olympics
Olympic bobsledders of Switzerland
Olympic silver medalists for Switzerland
Swiss male bobsledders
Olympic medalists in bobsleigh
Medalists at the 1936 Winter Olympics
20th-century Swiss people